Snezhanka, alternatively transliterated Snejanka, may refer to:

 Snezhanka (cave), in the Rhodope mountains, Bulgaria.
 Snezhanka Peak
 Snezhanka Tower, a television tower near Pamporovo, Bulgaria.
 The Bulgarian version of the Tzatziki appetiser.